The 2016 International V8 Supercars Championship (often simplified to the 2016 V8 Supercars Championship and known from 1 July as the 2016 Virgin Australia Supercars Championship) was an FIA-sanctioned international motor racing series for Supercars. It was the eighteenth running of the Supercars Championship and the twentieth series in which Supercars have contested the premier Australian touring car title.

Mark Winterbottom started the season as the defending drivers' champion, while Triple Eight Race Engineering were the defending teams' champions.

Shane van Gisbergen, driving for Triple Eight Race Engineering, secured his first championship title with one race remaining, winning eight races during the season. Triple Eight Race Engineering won the Teams' Championship for the seventh consecutive season. Van Gisbergen, along with Alexandre Prémat, also won the Pirtek Enduro Cup.

Teams and drivers
Twenty-six cars contested the 2016 season. Holden, Nissan and Volvo were all represented by factory-backed teams. Ford, having scaled back its involvement in 2015, were providing no financial or technical assistance, but were still represented by Prodrive Racing Australia and DJR Team Penske.

The following drivers contested the 2016 championship.

Team changes

Charlie Schwerkolt Racing terminated its customer arrangement with the Holden Racing Team, to field an in-house entry under the new Team 18 name.
 DJR Team Penske expanded to run two cars, having run a single car in 2015. The team took back the Racing Entitlement Contract (REC) it had leased to Super Black Racing in 2015.
Erebus Motorsport switched from running Mercedes-AMG E63 W212s to Holden Commodore VFs.
Triple Eight Race Engineering expanded to field three cars, purchasing a REC last used in 2014 by James Rosenberg Racing.
Walkinshaw Racing ceased at the end of 2015, with its REC sold to Super Black Racing.

Driver changes
Changed teams
Tim Blanchard moved from Lucas Dumbrell Motorsport to Britek Motorsport.
Fabian Coulthard moved from Brad Jones Racing to DJR Team Penske.
Will Davison moved from Erebus Motorsport to Tekno Autosports.
Andre Heimgartner moved from Super Black Racing to Lucas Dumbrell Motorsport.
James Moffat moved from Nissan Motorsport to Garry Rogers Motorsport to replace David Wall.
Chaz Mostert moved from Prodrive Racing Australia to Rod Nash Racing, a customer team whose car is prepared by Prodrive Racing Australia. The team cited commercial reasons for Mostert's move.
David Reynolds moved from Rod Nash Racing to Erebus Motorsport.
Tim Slade moved from Walkinshaw Racing to Brad Jones Racing.
Shane van Gisbergen moved from Tekno Autosports to Triple Eight Race Engineering.
Dale Wood moved from Britek Motorsport to Nissan Motorsport.

Entering series
Aaren Russell, having raced a wildcard entry at the 2015 Supercheap Auto Bathurst 1000, joined Erebus Motorsport for his first full-time season, replacing Ashley Walsh.
Cameron Waters replaced Chaz Mostert at Prodrive Racing Australia after winning the 2015 V8 Supercars Dunlop Series for the team. Waters had previously raced for the team in the main series as a substitute for Mostert while the latter recovered from an injury.

Mid-season changes
Lee Holdsworth was injured in a heavy crash at the start of Race 13 at the CrownBet Darwin Triple Crown. His team, Team 18, originally planned to use its endurance co-driver, Karl Reindler, to replace Holdsworth at the Townsville event. However, as the team's car could not be fixed in time for the event, a deal was made with Dunlop Series driver Kurt Kostecki, with Kostecki to race for the team at the Townsville and Ipswich events using his own chassis. The team completed the build of a new car ahead of the Sydney SuperSprint and Reindler drove the car at the event, with Holdsworth making his racing return at the Sandown 500.
Aaren Russell and his sponsor Plus Fitness split with Erebus Motorsport prior to the Coates Hire Ipswich SuperSprint. He was replaced by Craig Baird, one of the team's endurance co-drivers, for the event. Dunlop Series racer Shae Davies, who was scheduled to contest the Enduro Cup events with the team, was announced as the full-time replacement for Russell.

Calendar
The 2016 calendar was released on 8 September 2015. On 1 October 2015 the calendar was revised, with Tasmania and the non-championship Australian Grand Prix races switching dates due to an updated 2016 Formula One calendar. A further revision was made on 22 March 2016, with the Sydney 500 being moved back one week to avoid clashing with other events at Sydney Olympic Park.

Calendar changes
 The Phillip Island SuperSprint moved from November to April.
 The series was scheduled to visit Malaysia for the first time, with a round of the championship to be held as part of the Kuala Lumpur City Grand Prix. However, the event was cancelled following a legal dispute involving the event promoters.

Format changes
 The two 60 kilometre races held on the Saturday of SuperSprint events were replaced by a single 120 km race, with a compulsory pit stop to change tyres.
 The Auckland event used the International SuperSprint format that was also used at the non-championship V8 Supercars Challenge event at the Australian Grand Prix, with four 100 km races held across the weekend.
 The Sydney 500 reverted to its original two race format, with a single 250 km race held on each of Saturday and Sunday, after a pair of 125 km races were held on Saturday in 2014 and 2015.
 Soft tyres were used at all events except for the Bathurst 1000 and Phillip Island SuperSprint, with the season allocation increasing from 324 to 400 soft tyres per car.
 Practice sessions for endurance co-drivers were held at the Winton and Queensland Raceway rounds.

Testing changes
The compulsory pre-season test was scrapped. Teams were allowed three test days, one of which had to be used before the season commences. Rookie drivers and drivers who had not competed in the series for over three years were allowed an additional three days of testing.

Season results

Event summaries

Clipsal 500 Adelaide

Scott Pye took his first pole position in the series in qualifying for the first race in Adelaide. He would only finish the race in twelfth place, however, after a slow pit stop. Jamie Whincup won the race after starting from second place, ahead of James Courtney and Shane van Gisbergen. Chaz Mostert, in his first race meeting since being injured at the 2015 Supercheap Auto Bathurst 1000, took pole position for the second race. Courtney won the race after a close battle with Whincup, while Mostert finished third. Chris Pither crashed at Turn 8, with the car sustaining enough damage to rule it out of the third race. The third race was marred by heavy rain and controversy over the start of the race and fuel regulations. Nick Percat took his first solo victory in the series, having completed only 48 of the scheduled 78 laps. Polesitter Fabian Coulthard and his teammate Pye finished second and third on the road, but were given a one-minute penalty each as neither had taken on 140 litres of fuel during the race as required by the regulations. Michael Caruso inherited second place ahead of Garth Tander. Caruso left the event with the championship lead ahead of Whincup and van Gisbergen.

Tyrepower Tasmania SuperSprint

Shane van Gisbergen took his first championship race win for Triple Eight Race Engineering in the first race of the Tyrepower Tasmania SuperSprint, taking victory over his teammate Jamie Whincup. Will Davison scored his first podium finish for Tekno Autosports by finishing third. Mark Winterbottom had qualified on pole position, but finished ninth after a slow pit stop and running off the circuit. Davison was fastest and qualifying for the second race, but was given a two-place grid penalty for impeding James Courtney, which gave pole position to Winterbottom. Van Gisbergen looked set to take victory until late in the race, when oil dropped by Cameron Waters' car caused him to go off the circuit and get stuck in a gravel trap. This allowed Davison through to take victory, with Craig Lowndes finishing second ahead of Winterbottom. Chris Pither suffered another heavy crash, when contact with Nick Percat caused his car to spin into the wall. Davison's win gave him the lead in the championship, with Lowndes moving up to second place ahead of Whincup and Winterbottom.

WD-40 Phillip Island SuperSprint

The Phillip Island event was dominated by Scott McLaughlin, who won both races from pole position. He beat Jamie Whincup by just over one second in the first race, while Fabian Coulthard scored his first podium finish for DJR Team Penske. Chaz Mostert had been on course to finish third before suffering a tyre failure on the final lap, which dropped him to 23rd place. Coulthard's teammate Scott Pye also had a puncture late in the race, causing him to finish last and two laps off the lead. Whincup looked set to again finish second in the Sunday race but went off the circuit after a safety car period late in the race. This allowed Mark Winterbottom to take second place ahead of Pye, with Whincup finishing fourth. As Will Davison struggled across the weekend, Whincup took the championship lead while McLaughlin moved into second place, ahead of Winterbottom and Lowndes.

Perth SuperSprint

Cameron Waters took his first pole position in the series in a rain-affected qualifying session prior to Race 8. He would only finish 13th in the race, however, due to poor tyre life. The race started in wet conditions but it was dry enough for drivers to change to slick tyres within the first ten laps. Craig Lowndes utilised a two-pit stop strategy to take his first victory of the season, ahead of his teammates Shane van Gisbergen and Jamie Whincup. Chris Pither scored his best result of the season by finishing eighth. Mark Winterbottom had a difficult race, finishing 22nd after going off the circuit and later being spun. He recovered to take victory in Race 9, despite being slowed when Aaren Russell unlapped himself in the closing stages. Scott McLaughlin and Lowndes completed the podium. Whincup finished eleventh, allowing Lowndes to take the championship lead.

Woodstock Winton SuperSprint

Tim Slade won both races at the Winton event, the first of which was his maiden victory in the series. He won the first race from pole position ahead of Scott McLaughlin and Mark Winterbottom. Cameron Waters had a high-speed spin after making contact with James Courtney halfway through the race. Chaz Mostert took pole position for Race 11 but would only finish 20th after clashing with Courtney and suffering a puncture. The incident also damaged Courtney's car and he finished 25th, 14 laps off the lead. Slade took a comfortable victory over Winterbottom, while Fabian Coulthard scored his second podium finish of the season. Waters and David Reynolds both had strong races, finishing fifth and sixth respectively. Winterbottom's two podium finishes elevated him to the championship lead ahead of McLaughlin and Jamie Whincup.

Darwin Triple Crown

Michael Caruso took his first race win since 2009, and the first for Nissan Motorsport since 2013, in the first race of the CrownBet Darwin Triple Crown. Jamie Whincup regained the championship lead by finishing second, with Mark Winterbottom and Scott McLaughlin finishing ninth and tenth respectively, while Chaz Mostert scored his second podium finish of the season in third place. Shane van Gisbergen had started from pole position but he received a drive-through penalty for a restart infringement which dropped him down the order. The second race of the weekend was marred by two major crashes on the opening lap, the first of which left Lee Holdsworth in hospital with fractures to his pelvis, right knee and two ribs. The second involved Mostert, James Moffat and Fabian Coulthard and left Coulthard's car with significant damage. Todd Kelly led the opening lap but was hit by Winterbottom following a safety restart and fell down the order. Winterbottom received a drive-through penalty for his actions; he would receive another later in the race when he made contact with Aaren Russell. Van Gisbergen won the race, having again started from pole position, ahead of Tim Slade and Craig Lowndes. Whincup finished eighth to maintain the championship lead, with Lowndes in second and McLaughlin in third.

Castrol Edge Townsville 400

The Castrol Edge Townsville 400 was dominated by Triple Eight Race Engineering, with two of its drivers, Jamie Whincup and Shane van Gisbergen, sharing the race wins between them. Kurt Kostecki made his championship debut, substituting for the injured Lee Holdsworth. Whincup took his first pole position of the season in qualifying for Race 14 and went on to win the race, his first victory since Adelaide. Van Gisbergen finished second ahead of Mark Winterbottom. Scott McLaughlin lost ground in the championship after contact with Dale Wood on the first lap damaged his car, leaving him to finish in 24th place. Van Gisbergen took victory in Race 15 ahead of James Courtney, who used fresh tyres in the closing stages to pass a number of cars. Winterbottom was third after starting from pole position while Whincup finished fourth after using an alternative strategy. Whincup maintained the championship lead, 53 points clear of van Gisbergen, with Winterbottom a further 22 points behind in third.

Coates Hire Ipswich SuperSprint

Aaren Russell and his sponsor Plus Fitness split with Erebus Motorsport ahead of the event; he was replaced by one of the team's endurance co-drivers, Craig Baird. Chris Pither took his first pole position in the series in qualifying for the Saturday race, but lost places early in the race and finished eleventh. Shane van Gisbergen passed his teammates Jamie Whincup and Craig Lowndes late in the race to take victory, with Mark Winterbottom and Chaz Mostert completing the top five. Nick Percat was disqualified from the race after it was found his car's front bumper was underweight. The Sunday race was won by Lowndes with Whincup and Mostert completing the podium. Van Gisbergen finished twelfth after struggling with the balance of his car. He was also involved in an incident with Rick Kelly and James Courtney which damaged the suspension on Courtney's car, forcing him to retire from the race. Whincup extended his championship lead to 110 points over van Gisbergen while Winterbottom remained in third, a further ten points behind.

Sydney Motorsport Park SuperSprint

Two drivers changes took place ahead of the Sydney SuperSprint. Karl Reindler replaced Kurt Kostecki at Team 18, while Shae Davies was announced as the full-time replacement for Aaren Russell at Erebus Motorsport after Craig Baird filled in at the previous event. Triple Eight Race Engineering further extended its winning streak, with Shane van Gisbergen taking victory in the first race after a close battle with teammate Jamie Whincup. James Courtney completed the podium ahead of polesitter Chaz Mostert. Mostert took his second pole position of the weekend in qualifying for the Sunday race but it was Whincup who took victory. It was his 100th race win in the series, making him the second driver after Craig Lowndes to reach the mark. Lowndes finished second and celebrated a milestone himself, the race being his 600th in the championship, while Mostert completed the podium. Van Gisbergen finished fifth despite being spun by James Moffat in the closing stages; this result saw Whincup extend his championship lead to 137 points, while Lowndes moved past Mark Winterbottom for third after Winterbottom finished both races outside the top ten.

Wilson Security Sandown 500

Supercheap Auto Bathurst 1000

Castrol Gold Coast 600

ITM Auckland SuperSprint

Coates Hire Sydney 500

Championship standings

Points system
Points were awarded for each race at an event, to the driver or drivers of a car that completed at least 75% of the race distance and was running at the completion of the race, up to a maximum of 300 points per event.

Short format: Used for the first two races at the Clipsal 500 Adelaide and all International SuperSprint races.
Long format: Used for all SuperSprint and SuperStreet races, with the exception of the first two races of the Clipsal 500 Adelaide, and for both races of the Gold Coast 600.
Endurance format: Used for the Sandown 500 and Bathurst 1000.

Drivers' Championship

Enduro Cup

Teams' Championship

Notes:
‡ — Denotes a single-car team.

See also
 2016 V8 Supercar season

References

External links
 Coates Hire Leaderboard (2016 Drivers Championship & Teams Championship points), www.supercars.com, as archived at web.archive.org
 Pirtek Enduro Cup (2016 points), www.supercars.com, as archived at web.archive.org

Supercars Championship seasons
International V8 Supercars